The 2019–20 season was Cambridge United's 108th season in their history, their 41st in the Football League, and their sixth consecutive season in League Two. Along with League Two, the club participated in the FA Cup, EFL Cup and EFL Trophy.

The season covers the period from 1 July 2019 to 30 June 2020.

Season squad

Transfers

Transfers in

Loans in

Loans out

Transfers out

Pre-season
On 23 May 2019, The U's announced their pre-season schedule.  On 21 June 2019 a further two matches during a tour of Scotland were confirmed.

Competitions

League Two

League table

Results summary

Results by matchday

Matches
On Thursday, 20 June 2019, the EFL League Two fixtures were revealed.

FA Cup

The first round draw was made on 21 October 2019.

EFL Cup

The first round draw was made on 20 June. The second round draw was made on 13 August 2019 following the conclusion of all but one first round matches.

EFL Trophy

On 9 July 2019, the pre-determined group stage draw was announced with Invited clubs to be drawn on 12 July 2019.

References

Cambridge United F.C. seasons
Cambridge United